Berland is a surname. Notable people with the surname include: 

 Bjørn Berland (born 1977), Norwegian footballer
Eliezer Berland (born 1937), Israeli Breslov rabbi
François Berland (born 1958), French actor
Gary Berland (1950–1988), American professional poker player
Gretchen Berland, American physician and filmmaker
Kjartan Berland (born 1972), Norwegian politician
Leslie Berland, first Chief Marketing Officer of Twitter
Lucien Berland (1888–1962), French entomologist and arachnologist
Michael Berland (born 1968), founder and CEO of Decode_M and Edelman
Pey Berland (c. 1380 – 1458), Archbishop of Bordeaux from 1430 to 1456
Robert Berland (born 1961), American judoka
Roland Berland (born 1945), French racing cyclist
Thibaut Berland (born 1981), French producer and DJ, better known as Breakbot
Yvon Berland (born 1951), French university professor and administrator

Berland is also used as a surname, though rarely. Notable people with the given name include:

 Berland Anthony (1923–?), Indian professional footballer

Other uses

 Berland River, a stream in Alberta, Canada; tributary of the Athabasca River
 Berland, Askøy, a village of Askøy municipality, Vestland county, Norway
 Berland., taxonomic author abbreviation of Jean-Louis Berlandier (1803–1851), French-Mexican naturalist, physician, and anthropologist
 Tour Pey-Berland, the bell tower of the Bordeaux Cathedral